Franz Joseph II (Franz Josef Maria Aloys Alfred Karl Johannes Heinrich Michael Georg Ignaz Benediktus Gerhardus Majella; 16 August 1906 – 13 November 1989) was the reigning Prince of Liechtenstein from 25 July 1938 until his death in 1989.

Franz Joseph was the son of Prince Aloys of Liechtenstein and Archduchess Elisabeth Amalie of Austria. He succeeded his childless grand-uncle, Prince Franz I, after his father renounced his right of succession in his favour in 1923.

During his reign, women received voting rights for the first time, following a referendum on the topic (among men only) in 1984.

Franz Joseph was an extremely popular sovereign in Liechtenstein. He was the first ruling prince to live full-time in the principality. He also oversaw the economic development of Liechtenstein from a poor agricultural backwater into one of the richest countries (per capita) in the world.

World War II
Liechtenstein remained neutral throughout World War II, and its neutrality was not violated by any of the combatants.

Just before the end of the war, the Prince granted political asylum to 494 First Russian National Army pro-Axis pro-emperor Vladimir White emigres led by General Boris Smyslovsky.

Marriage and children
On 7 March 1943, at St. Florin's in Vaduz, Franz Joseph II married Countess Georgina of Wilczek (24 October 1921 – 18 October 1989). They had five children, twelve grandchildren and nineteen great-grandchildren:

Hans-Adam II, Prince of Liechtenstein (14 February 1945, Zürich) he married Countess Marie Aglaë of Wchinitz and Tettau on 30 July 1967. They have four children and fifteen grandchildren.
Prince Philipp of Liechtenstein (19 August 1946, Zürich) he married Isabelle de l'Arbre de Malander on 11 September 1971. They have three sons and four grandchildren.
 Prince Nikolaus of Liechtenstein (24 October 1947, Zürich) he married Princess Margaretha of Luxembourg on 20 March 1982. They have four children.
Princess Norberta of Liechtenstein (31 October 1950, Zürich) she married Don Vicente Sartorius y Cabeza de Vaca, 3rd Marqués de Mariño on 11 June 1988. They have one daughter.
Prince Franz Josef Wenceslaus of Liechtenstein (Zürich, 19 November 1962 – Vaduz, 28 February 1991). Died unmarried and without issue, at the age of twenty-eight.

Final years
Franz Joseph handed over most of his powers to his son, Hans-Adam, on 26 August 1984.
Franz Joseph II died on 13 November 1989, a mere twenty-six days after his wife. Ruling Liechtenstein for 51 years, he was among the longest-ruling sovereigns in Europe and the longest-serving national leader in the world at the time of his death.

Honours
 Austria
  Austrian Imperial and Royal family: Knight with Collar of the Order of the Golden Fleece
 : Grand Cross of the Decoration of Honour for Services to the Republic of Austria, Grand Star
  Greek Royal Family: Knight Grand Cross of the Royal Order of the Redeemer
  Iranian Imperial Family: Recipient of the Commemorative Medal of the 2,500-year Celebration of the Persian Empire
: Knight Grand Cross with Collar of the Order of the Holy Sepulchre
 : Knight Grand Cross with Collar of the Order of Pope Pius IX

See also
Princely Family of Liechtenstein

References

External links 
 Princely House of Liechtenstein

1906 births
1989 deaths
Liechtenstein people of Polish descent
International Olympic Committee members
Knights of the Golden Fleece of Austria
Recipients of the Grand Star of the Decoration for Services to the Republic of Austria
Princes of Liechtenstein
Liechtenstein Roman Catholics
World War II political leaders
Knights of the Holy Sepulchre
Knights Grand Cross of the Order of Pope Pius IX
Honorary Knights of the Teutonic Order
20th-century Liechtenstein people